Ann-Margaret E. Carrozza (born December 17, 1966) is an American lawyer and politician from New York, who was a member of the New York State Assembly from 1997 to 2010.

She has appeared in numerous episodes of the Dr. Phil Show.

Biography 
Carrozza completed undergraduate studies at SUNY Albany and Empire State College. She received her Juris Doctor degree from the Hofstra University School of Law. Prior to her election to the State Assembly, Carrozza served as a court attorney for Civil Court Judge Peter O'Donoghue and as a clinical intern in the Queens County District Attorney's Office.

She was a member of the New York State Assembly (26th D.) from 1997 to 2010, sitting in the 192nd, 193rd, 194th, 195th, 196th, 197th and 198th New York State Legislatures. Her district comprised East Flushing, Douglaston, Whitestone, Little Neck, Floral Park, Bay Terrace, and Bayside among other neighborhoods located in Northeast Queens. Carrozza was Chair of the Standing Committee on State and Federal Relations, as well as a member of several other standing committees, including Aging, Banks, Governmental Employees and Insurance.

On March 26, 2010, Carrozza announced that should would not be seeking re-election. She currently heads an elder law practice, with offices in Bayside, Queens, Port Jefferson, Glen Head, and Manhattan, and lives in Glen Head with her husband William Duke and her two sons.

References 

 

1960s births
Living people
Democratic Party members of the New York State Assembly
Women state legislators in New York (state)
Maurice A. Deane School of Law alumni
People from Bayside, Queens
People from Glen Head, New York
21st-century American politicians
21st-century American women politicians
20th-century American politicians
20th-century American women politicians